The Hokkaido montane conifer forests ecoregion covers the mountainous central regions of Hokkaido Island, the northernmost of Japan's main islands.  Forests of spruce and fir thrive in the subalpine, cool climate.  On the northeastern edge of the island, the conifer forests extend down to the sea under the influence of the cold Oyashio Current coming down from the north, although logging in recent years has put pressure on these stands.

Location and description 
The mountainous region is surrounded by the lower plains and hills of the Hokkaidō deciduous forests ecoregion. Central to the region is the Daisetsuzan Volcanic Group, the location of Daisetsuzan National Park, the largest national park in Japan. Above the conifer line, alpine conditions support thickets of Stone pine (Pinus pumila)

Climate 
The climate of the ecoregion is Humid continental climate, warm summer (Köppen climate classification (Dfb)). Average annual precipitation is 1,150 mm.

Flora and fauna 
The dominant trees in the region are Ezo spruce (Picea jezoensis), Sakhalin fir (Abies sachalinensis), and Sakhalin spruce (Picea glehnii). There are scattered stands of Erman's birch (Betula ermanii).

Protected areas 
 Daisetsuzan National Park
 Akan Mashu National Park
 Kushiro-shitsugen National Park
 Shikotsu-Tōya National Park

References 

Palearctic ecoregions
Ecoregions of Japan